in Shinto terminology are sacred spaces or altars used to worship. In their simplest form, they are square areas with green bamboo or sakaki at the corners without architecture. These in turn support sacred ropes (shimenawa) decorated with streamers called shide. A branch of sakaki or some other evergreen at the center acts as a yorishiro, a physical representation of the presence of the kami, a being which is in itself incorporeal.

During the Aoi Festival in Kyoto the himorogi is a square space surrounded by green branches with an evergreen tree at the center as a yorishiro. A more elaborate himorogi can also be made with a straw mat on the ground with on it a ceremonial 8-legged stand called an  decorated with shimenawa and sacred emblems.

The etymology of the word is unclear, but it appears already in the Nihon Shoki and in the Man'yōshū.  The term "himorogi" refers equally to the focal point "tree" and to the sacred space, both of which are deemed to be purified or "unpolluted".

Himorogi in Japan are most commonly seen at construction sites, where after use they stand for a while before actual work begins. They are built for a Shinto priest, who comes to bless the site during a ground-breaking ceremony called

See also 
 Koshintō
 Shintai
 The Glossary of Shinto for an explanation of terms concerning Japanese Shinto, Shinto art, and Shinto shrine architecture.

Notes

References
 Bocking, Brian. (1997). A Popular Dictionary of Shinto. Lincolnwood, Illinois: NTC Publishing. ;  OCLC 36977290
Iwanami Kōjien (広辞苑) Japanese dictionary, 6th Edition (2008), DVD version
 

Shinto in Japan
Shinto religious objects